</noinclude>
John Joseph O'Connor (November 23, 1885 – January 26, 1960) was an American lawyer and politician from New York City. From 1923 to 1939, he served eight terms in the U.S. House of Representatives.

A leader of the conservative Democrats, he chaired the powerful House Rules Committee. President Franklin Roosevelt made him a major target of his purge of Democrats who opposed the New Deal, and he was defeated in 1938.

Early life and education 
O'Connor was born in Raynham, Massachusetts. He graduated from Brown University in 1908 and Harvard University School of Law in 1911.

Political career 
He was a member of the New York State Assembly (New York Co., 12th D.) in 1921, 1922 and 1923.

Tenure in Congress 
He was elected as a Democrat to the 68th United States Congress to fill the vacancy caused by the death of W. Bourke Cockran, and was re-elected to the seven succeeding Congresses, holding office from November 6, 1923, to January 3, 1939. He was a delegate at large to the 1936 Democratic National Convention.

Rules chairman 
He was chairman of the House Rules Committee between 1935 and 1938. O'Connor was a spokesman for big business and helped defeat Roosevelt's executive reorganization bill. He tried and failed to keep the Fair Labor Standards Act bottled up in committee. Ridiculing the New Deal Coalition, he mocked the poor people who “go to the public trough to be fed.” He was one of the few Democrats targeted in the 1938 primaries by Franklin D. Roosevelt to be defeated.

Death and burial 
He died in Washington, and was interred at Gate of Heaven Cemetery in Silver Spring, Maryland.

References

Bibliography

 Polenberg, Richard. “Franklin Roosevelt and the Purge of John O’Connor: The Impact of Urban Change on Political Parties.” New York History 49#3 (1968), pp. 306–26, online

External links
 

Brown University alumni
Harvard Law School alumni
1885 births
1960 deaths
Democratic Party members of the New York State Assembly
Democratic Party members of the United States House of Representatives from New York (state)
Burials at Gate of Heaven Cemetery (Silver Spring, Maryland)
20th-century American politicians
People from Raynham, Massachusetts